Aleida Guevara March ( Guevara; born 24 November 1960) is the eldest daughter of four children born to Ernesto "Che" Guevara and his second wife, Aleida March.

She is a doctor of medicine, based at the William Soler Children's Hospital in Havana. She has also worked as a physician in Angola, Ecuador, and Nicaragua.  She is interviewed about the philosophy behind universal health care in Michael Moore's film Sicko.

Guevara has been an advocate for human rights and debt relief for developing nations. She is the author of the book Chávez, Venezuela and the New Latin America.

Early youth 
Although Aleida was only four and a half when her father left Cuba to foment revolution in the Congo, and almost seven when he was executed in Bolivia, she still has fond memories of him. One such story that she has shared publicly is that her father (Che) would make up animal stories for his faraway children, stating:

Her father's influence 

Guevara refers to her father Che as a source of personal inspiration. When giving speeches throughout the world, she often mentions his writings, remarking that she finds his diaries particularly helpful for their "political insights and emotional maturity". She has also stated that she finds herself occasionally exclaiming: "Caramba! If only we'd put in practice this or that suggestion we would be in a better position now." In reference to her father's widespread use as a symbol of rebellion, she has stated that when she sees a child carrying his image on a march and the child says, "I want to be like Che and fight until final victory", she feels elated.

In discussing her father's legacy, Aleida has remarked that:

Angolan medical mission 
Guevara cites her time as part of a Cuban medical mission in Angola as leaving a lasting mark. She describes the impact of this experience with these words:

Chavez, Venezuela, and the New Latin America 
Aleida Guevara interviewed former Venezuelan president Hugo Chávez for the book Chavez, Venezuela, and the New Latin America in February 2004. The book was turned into a documentary and includes excerpts from the interview with Chávez discussing the Bolivarian Revolution, interviews with Cuban humanitarian doctors working for the poor in Venezuela, an interview with General Jorge Carneiro about the April 2002 coup attempt, as well as scenes of life and support for Chávez in Venezuela.

Current work and personal life 

As of 2009, Guevara helps run two homes for disabled children in Cuba and two more for refugee children with domestic problems. As a pediatrician specializing in childhood allergies, she has also been involved in medical support for a community in the flooded area around Río Cauto in eastern Cuba, while she has announced plans to work on the Island of Youth, which was devastated by several 2008 hurricanes.

She also participates as public intellectual and activist in conferences, debates and festivals, such as the Subversive Festival from 4 to 8 May 2013, in Zagreb, Croatia. There she was guest speaker next to other notable public thinkers like Slavoj Žižek and Tariq Ali.

She has two daughters, Estefania (aka 'guapísima') and Celia.

See also 

Cuban medical internationalism
Healthcare in Cuba

References

External links 
'I Grew Up with Extraordinary People'  by Aleida Guevara March  (January 2017)
Che Guevara's Daughter Voices Cuban Fears That Bush has Country in His Sights by Terri Judd, 16 October 2004, The Independent.
Che, My Father by Angelique Chrisafis, 3 May 2002, The Guardian.
Guevara's Daughter has a Cause, in the Image of her Father, 28 June 2003.
Journey Around My Father, 2 July 2003.
On the Motorcycle Behind my Father, Che Guevara by Aleida Guevara, 12 October 2004, International Herald Tribune.
Che's Daughter to Rally Reds for May Day March by Andrew Picken, Edinburgh Evening News, 11 April 2009
Dr. Aleida Guevara Speaks at 2010 International Che Guevara Conference by The Vancouver Observer

1960 births
Living people
Cuban pediatricians
Che Guevara
Cuban people of Basque descent
Cuban people of Spanish descent
Cuban people of Irish descent
Cuban people of Argentine descent